Primorye is the name of several inhabited localities in Russia:
Primorye, Kaliningrad Oblast, an urban locality (an urban-type settlement) in Svetlogorsky District of Kaliningrad Oblast
Primorye, Perm Krai, a rural locality (a village) in Chastinsky District of Perm Krai

See also
Primorsky Krai, a federal subject of Russia informally known as Primorye
Primorsk (disambiguation)
Primorsky (disambiguation)

References

ja:プリモリェ
ru:Приморье (значения)